Wickham Terrace is one of the historic streets of Brisbane, Queensland, Australia. It is known as the street of private medical specialists.

Geography

Wickham Terrace commences at the western corner of the intersection of Ann Street and Wharf Street in the Brisbane central business district and then gradually rises in a winding westerly direction up the slopes of Spring Hill. It then follows the ridge and rises to the north and then to the west, creating the upper boundary of Albert Park. The name Wickham Terrace terminates at the intersection with Gregory Terrace but the road continues as College Road through into the Normanby Fiveways.

History

Land sales occurred on Wickham Terrace in 1856. Because Spring Hill is higher than main Brisbane township, it was attractive for its views and cooling breezes. The better ventilation afforded by the breezes was also believed to create a healthier place to life, due to the prevailing belief in miasma (that disease was spread through bad air). Many prominent citizens built homes in Wickham Terrace and many civic institutions were established there. Over time, hospitals and medical practices began to dominate the street and, since World War II, Wickham Terrace has been noted for its private medical specialists (similar to Harley Street in London).

Wickham Terrace is named after John Clements Wickham, the police magistrate and Government Resident of the Moreton Bay district.

Landmarks

Many Brisbane landmarks are located on Wickham Terrace (as numbered, starting from the intersection at Ann and Wharf Streets):
 25: St Andrew's Lutheran Church
 32: All Saints Anglican Church
 73: Inchcolm
 79: Lister House
 97: Espie Dods House
 121: Ballow Chambers
 136: Wickham Terrace Car Park
 155-157: Wickham House
 163: Baptist City Tabernacle
 193: United Service Club Premises
 217: Craigston
 226: The Old Windmill
 230: Spring Hill Reservoirs
 287: Bryntirion
 307: Athol Place
 330: Wickham Park Air Raid Shelters
 351: St Alban's Liberal Catholic Church
 355: Theosophical Society Building
 465: St Andrews War Memorial Hospital
 497-535: Lady Bowen Hospital
 500: Monier Ventilation Shaft 1
 Roma Street Parklands (formerly Albert Park)

References

External links

Streets in Brisbane
Spring Hill, Queensland
Brisbane central business district